The following is the list of Ambassadors and High Commissioners to India. High Commissioners represent member states of the Commonwealth of Nations and Ambassadors represent other states. Note that some diplomats are accredited to more than one country.

See also
 Foreign relations of India
 List of ambassadors and high commissioners of India
 List of diplomatic missions of India
 List of diplomatic missions in India
 Visa policy of India
 Visa requirements for Indian citizens

References

External links
 Diplomatic missions in India - Ministry of External Affairs
  International Organisations and Other Agencies in India
 Consular, Trade & Information Offices in India
 Honorary Consulates in India
 

 
India